The 2021–22 Miami Heat season was the 34th season of the franchise in the National Basketball Association (NBA). The Heat looked to improve after the previous season’s first-round exit sweep against the eventual champion Milwaukee Bucks. For the first time since 2019, Andre Iguodala was not on the roster as he returned to the Golden State Warriors. 

On August 6, 2021, the Miami Heat acquired Kyle Lowry from the Raptors via a sign-and-trade in exchange for Goran Dragić and Precious Achiuwa. On November 6, 2021, Lowry recorded his first triple double with the Heat and his 19th career triple double in a 118–115 win over the Utah Jazz with a statline of 20 points, 12 rebounds and 10 assist while shooting 72% from the field.

During the 2022 playoff run, Lowry missed multiple games due to a hamstring injury. On May 27, in Game 6 of the Eastern Conference Finals, Lowry recorded a double-double of 18 points and 10 assists in a 111–103 win over the Boston Celtics.

On March 18, with a win over the Oklahoma City Thunder, the Heat won the Southeast Division. On April 7, for only the fourth time in their history, they also clinched the No.1 Seed in the Eastern Conference.

The Heat defeated the Atlanta Hawks in the first round in five games, then defeated the Philadelphia 76ers in the second round in six games and faced the Boston Celtics in the Eastern Conference Finals where they lost at home in a seven-game series. This is the first time that the Heat were eliminated in the conference finals since 2005.

This is Miami's first season where they play their home games in the newly-renamed FTX Arena.

Draft picks

Miami did not carry any draft picks for the 2021 NBA draft.

Roster

Standings

Division

Conference

Game log

Preseason 

|-style="background:#cfc;"
| 1
| October 4
| Atlanta
| 
| Tyler Herro (26)
| Omer Yurtseven (8)
| Lowry, Vincent (7)
| FTX Arena19,600
| 1–0
|-style="background:#cfc;"
| 2
| October 7
| @ Houston
| 
| Tyler Herro (24)
| Tyler Herro (9)
| Kyle Lowry (10)
| Toyota Center10,491
| 2–0
|-style="background:#cfc;"
| 3
| October 8
| @ San Antonio
| 
| Max Strus (28)
| Micah Potter (17)
| Javonte Smart (5)
| AT&T Center15,160
| 3–0
|-style="background:#cfc;"
| 4
| October 11
| Charlotte
| 
| Bam Adebayo (18)
| Omer Yurtseven (8)
| Garrett, Lowry (5)
| FTX Arena19,600
| 4–0
|-style="background:#fcc;"
| 5
| October 14
| @ Atlanta
|  
| Javonte Smart (20)
| Micah Potter (16)
| Gabe Vincent (10)
| State Farm Arena12,527
| 4–1
|-style="background:#cfc;"
| 6
| October 15
| Boston
| 
| Tyler Herro (29)
| Bam Adebayo (7)
| Butler, Herro (4)
| FTX Arena19,600
| 5–1

Regular season

|-style="background:#cfc;"
| 1
| October 21
| Milwaukee
| 
| Tyler Herro (27)
| Bam Adebayo (13)
| Kyle Lowry (6)
| FTX Arena19,600
| 1–0
|-style="background:#fcc;"
| 2
| October 23
| @ Indiana
|  
| Tyler Herro (30)
| Bam Adebayo (16)
| Jimmy Butler (6)
| Gainbridge Fieldhouse17,147
| 1–1
|-style="background:#cfc;"
| 3
| October 25
| Orlando
|  
| Jimmy Butler (36)
| Bam Adebayo (13)
| Tyler Herro (9)
| FTX Arena19,600
| 2–1
|-style="background:#cfc;"
| 4
| October 27
| @ Brooklyn
| 
| Bam Adebayo (24)
| Jimmy Butler (14)
| Jimmy Butler (7)
| Barclays Center17,732
| 3–1
|-style="background:#cfc;"
| 5
| October 29
| Charlotte
| 
| Jimmy Butler (32)
| Bam Adebayo (19)
| Tyler Herro (6)
| FTX Arena19,600
| 4–1
|-style="background:#cfc;"
| 6
| October 30
| @ Memphis
| 
| Tyler Herro (22)
| Dewayne Dedmon (9)
| Kyle Lowry (8)
| FedExForum15,989
| 5–1

|-style="background:#cfc;"
| 7
| November 2
| @ Dallas
| 
| Jimmy Butler (23)
| Bam Adebayo (13)
| Kyle Lowry (9)
| American Airlines Center19,255
| 6–1
|-style="background:#fcc;"
| 8
| November 4
| Boston
| 
| Jimmy Butler (20)
| Tucker, Adebayo, Lowry, Herro (7)
| Kyle Lowry (5)
| FTX Arena19,600
| 6–2
|-style="background:#cfc;"
| 9
| November 6
| Utah
| 
| Tyler Herro (29)
| Kyle Lowry (12)
| Kyle Lowry (10)
| FTX Arena19,600
| 7–2
|-style="background:#fcc;"
| 10
| November 8
| @ Denver
| 
| Jimmy Butler (31)
| Bam Adebayo (10)
| Jimmy Butler (8)
| Ball Arena15,577
| 7–3
|-style="background:#fcc;"
| 11
| November 10
| @ L.A. Lakers
| 
| Bam Adebayo (28)
| P. J. Tucker (13)
| Kyle Lowry (11)
| Staples Center18,997
| 7–4
|-style="background:#fcc;"
| 12
| November 11
| @ L.A. Clippers
| 
| Bam Adebayo (30)
| Bam Adebayo (11)
| Gabe Vincent (6)
| Staples Center16,150
| 7–5
|-style="background:#cfc;"
| 13
| November 13
| @ Utah
| 
| Tyler Herro (27)
| P. J. Tucker (11)
| Bam Adebayo (7)
| Vivint Arena18,306
| 8–5
|-style="background:#cfc;"
| 14
| November 15
| @ Oklahoma City
| 
| Tyler Herro (26)
| Dedmon, Herro, Okpala (7)
| Kyle Lowry (11)
| Paycom Center12,330
| 9–5
|-style="background:#cfc;"
| 15
| November 17
| New Orleans
| 
| Jimmy Butler (31)
| Jimmy Butler (10)
| Jimmy Butler (10)
| FTX Arena19,600
| 10–5
|-style="background:#cfc;"
| 16
| November 18
| Washington
| 
| Jimmy Butler (32)
| Bam Adebayo (9)
| Jimmy Butler (4)
| FTX Arena19,600
| 11–5
|-style="background:#fcc;"
| 17
| November 20
| @ Washington
| 
| Jimmy Butler (29)
| Bam Adebayo (6)
| Kyle Lowry (7)
| Capital One Arena20,476
| 11–6
|-style="background:#cfc;"
| 18
| November 23
| @ Detroit
| 
| Tyler Herro (31)
| Adebayo, Butler (9)
| Kyle Lowry (8)
| Little Caesars Arena13,123
| 12–6
|-style="background:#fcc;"
| 19
| November 24
| @ Minnesota
| 
| Bam Adebayo (18)
| Jimmy Butler (8)
| Butler, Lowry (5)
| Target Center17,136
| 12–7
|-style="background:#cfc;"
| 20
| November 27
| @ Chicago
| 
| Gabe Vincent (20)
| Bam Adebayo (17)
| Adebayo, Lowry (6)
| United Center21,110
| 13–7
|-style="background:#fcc;"
| 21
| November 29
| Denver
| 
| Bam Adebayo (24)
| Bam Adebayo (13)
| Kyle Lowry (14)
| FTX Arena19,600
| 13–8

|-style="background:#fcc;"
| 22
| December 1
| Cleveland
| 
| Tyler Herro (21)
| Dewayne Dedmon (13)
| Tyler Herro (6)
| FTX Arena19,600
| 13–9
|-style="background:#cfc;"
| 23
| December 3
| @ Indiana
| 
| Kyle Lowry (26)
| Dedmon, Tucker (6)
| Kyle Lowry (9)
| Gainbridge Fieldhouse13,854
| 14–9
|-style="background:#fcc;"
| 24
| December 4
| @ Milwaukee
| 
| Tyler Herro (14)
| Dewayne Dedmon (13)
| Kyle Lowry (7)
| Fiserv Forum17,341
| 14–10
|-style="background:#fcc;"
| 25
| December 6
| Memphis
| 
| Tyler Herro (24)
| Dewayne Dedmon (6)
| Kyle Lowry (8)
| FTX Arena19,600
| 14–11
|-style="background:#cfc;"
| 26
| December 8
| Milwaukee
| 
| Caleb Martin (28)
| Dedmon, Okpala (9)
| Kyle Lowry (13)
| FTX Arena19,600
| 15–11
|-style="background:#cfc;"
| 27
| December 11
| Chicago
| 
| Duncan Robinson (26)
| Dewayne Dedmon (12)
| Kyle Lowry (14)
| FTX Arena19,731
| 16–11
|-style="background:#fcc;"
| 28
| December 13
| @ Cleveland
| 
| P. J. Tucker (23)
| P. J. Tucker (9)
| Tucker, Lowry (5)
| Rocket Mortgage FieldHouse17,401
| 16–12
|-style="background:#cfc;"
| 29
| December 15
| @ Philadelphia
| 
| Gabe Vincent (26)
| Dewayne Dedmon (14)
| Dedmon, Lowry (5)
| Wells Fargo Center20,389
| 17–12
|-style="background:#cfc;"
| 30
| December 17
| @ Orlando
| 
| Max Strus (32)
| Ömer Yurtseven (12)
| Kyle Lowry (15)
| Amway Center14,103
| 18–12
|-style="background:#fcc;"
| 31
| December 19
| @ Detroit
| 
| Max Strus (24)
| Ömer Yurtseven (12)
| Kyle Lowry (10)
| Little Caesars Arena15,188
| 18–13
|-style="background:#cfc;"
| 32
| December 21
| Indiana
| 
| Herro, Robinson (26)
| Ömer Yurtseven (13)
| Kyle Lowry (12)
| FTX Arena19,600
| 19–13
|-style="background:#cfc;"
| 33
| December 23
| Detroit
| 
| Tyler Herro (29)
| Ömer Yurtseven (12)
| Gabe Vincent (7)
| FTX Arena19,600
| 20–13
|-style="background:#cfc;"
| 34
| December 26
| Orlando
| 
| Butler, Martin (17)
| Ömer Yurtseven (15)
| Herro, Vincent (8)
| FTX Arena19,600
| 21–13
|-style="background:#cfc;"
| 35
| December 28
| Washington
| 
| Tyler Herro (32)
| Ömer Yurtseven (14)
| Jimmy Butler (15)
| FTX Arena19,600
| 22–13
|-style="background:#bbb;"
| —
| December 29
| @ San Antonio
| colspan="6"|Postponed due to COVID-19 pandemic, makeup date February 3
|-style="background:#cfc;"
| 36
| December 31
| @ Houston
| 
| Jimmy Butler (37)
| Ömer Yurtseven (13)
| Tyler Herro (9)
| Toyota Center16,197
| 23–13
|-

|-style="background:#fcc;"
| 37
| January 2
| @ Sacramento
| 
| Herro, Yurtseven (22)
| Ömer Yurtseven (16)
| Kyle Lowry (12)
| Golden 1 Center13,699
| 23–14
|-style="background:#fcc;"
| 38
| January 3
| @ Golden State
| 
| Jimmy Butler (22)
| Ömer Yurtseven (17)
| Kyle Lowry (11)
| Chase Center18,064
| 23–15
|-style="background:#cfc;"
| 39
| January 5
| @ Portland
| 
| Max Strus (25)
| Ömer Yurtseven (16)
| Kyle Lowry (9)
| Moda Center15,773
| 24–15
|-style="background:#cfc;"
| 40
| January 8
| @ Phoenix
| 
| Tyler Herro (33)
| Ömer Yurtseven (16)
| Kyle Lowry (13)
| Footprint Center17,071
| 25–15
|-style="background:#cfc;"
| 41
| January 12
| @ Atlanta
| 
| Tyler Herro (21)
| Martin, Yurtseven (10)
| Tyler Herro (11)
| State Farm Arena15,355
| 26–15
|-style="background:#cfc;"
| 42
| January 14
| Atlanta
|  
| Tyler Herro (24)
| Ömer Yurtseven (11)
| Jimmy Butler (10)
| FTX Arena19,600
| 27–15
|-style="background:#fcc;"
| 43
| January 15
| Philadelphia
| 
| Ömer Yurtseven (22)
| Ömer Yurtseven (11)
| Jimmy Butler (9)
| FTX Arena19,600
| 27–16
|-style="background:#cfc;"
| 44
| January 17
| Toronto
| 
| Tyler Herro (23)
| Jimmy Butler (10)
| Jimmy Butler (10)
| FTX Arena19,600
| 28–16
|-style="background:#cfc;"
| 45
| January 19
| Portland
| 
| Caleb Martin (26)
| Bam Adebayo (11)
| Gabe Vincent (7)
| FTX Arena19,600
| 29–16
|-style="background:#fcc;"
| 46
| January 21
| @ Atlanta
| 
| Bam Adebayo (21)
| Jimmy Butler (8)
| Gabe Vincent (9)
| FTX Arena16,385
| 29–17
|-style="background:#cfc;"
| 47
| January 23
| L.A. Lakers
| 
| Duncan Robinson (25)
| Jimmy Butler (10)
| Jimmy Butler (12)
| FTX Arena19,973
| 30–17
|-style="background:#cfc;"
| 48
| January 26
| New York
| 
| Duncan Robinson (25)
| Bam Adebayo (8)
| Bam Adebayo (11)
| FTX Arena19,600
| 31–17
|-style="background:#cfc;"
| 49
| January 28
| L.A. Clippers
| 
| Jimmy Butler (26)
| Bam Adebayo (12)
| Jimmy Butler (9)
| FTX Arena19,600
| 32–17
|-style="background:#fcc;"
| 50
| January 29
| Toronto
| 
| Jimmy Butler (37)
| Bam Adebayo (16)
| Jimmy Butler (10)
| FTX Arena19,600
| 32–18
|-style="background:#fcc;"
| 51
| January 31
| @ Boston
|  
| Max Strus (27)
| Chris Silva (9)
| Gabe Vincent (9)
| TD Garden19,156
| 32–19
|-

|-style="background:#fcc;"
| 52
| February 1
| @ Toronto
|  
| Bam Adebayo (32)
| Bam Adebayo (11)
| Jimmy Butler (12)
| Scotiabank Arena0
| 32–20
|-style="background:#cfc;"
| 53
| February 3
| @ San Antonio
|  
| Tyler Herro (24)
| Bam Adebayo (11)
| Tyler Herro (5)
| AT&T Center14,971
| 33–20
|-style="background:#cfc;"
| 54
|February 5
| @ Charlotte
| 
| Jimmy Butler (27)
| Bam Adebayo (12)
| Kyle Lowry (6)
| Spectrum Center19,420
| 34-20
|-style="background:#cfc;"
| 55
| February 7
| @ Washington
| 
| Bam Adebayo (21)
| Tucker, Adebayo (7)
| Gabe Vincent (8)
| Capital One Arena14,222
| 35–20
|-style="background:#cfc;"
| 56
| February 10
| @ New Orleans
| 
| Butler, Adebayo (29)
| Kyle Lowry (11)
| Kyle Lowry (11)
| Smoothie King Center16,672
| 36–20
|-style="background:#cfc;"
| 57
| February 12
| Brooklyn
|  
| Bam Adebayo (19)
| Bam Adebayo (14)
| Kyle Lowry (6)
| FTX Arena19,600
| 37–20
|-style="background:#fcc;"
| 58
| February 15
| Dallas
|  
| Jimmy Butler (29)
| Bam Adebayo (12)
| Gabe Vincent (5) 
| FTX Arena19,600
| 37–21
|-style="background:#cfc;"
| 59
| February 17
| @ Charlotte
|  
| Kyle Lowry (25)
| Bam Adebayo (13)
| Jimmy Butler (8)
| Spectrum Center17,029
| 38–21
|-style="background:#cfc;"
| 60
| February 25
| @ New York
|  
| Tyler Herro (25)
| Bam Adebayo (16)
| Adebayo, Lowry, Vincent (4)
| Madison Square Garden19,812
| 39–21
|-style="background:#cfc;"
| 61
| February 26
| San Antonio
| 
| Bam Adebayo (36)
| Dedmon, Martin (7)
| Kyle Lowry (10)
| FTX Arena19,677
| 40–21
|-style="background:#cfc;"
| 62
| February 28
| Chicago
| 
| Vincent, Herro (20)
| Butler, Adebayo (7)
| Adebayo, Herro (5)
| FTX Arena19,683
| 41–21
|-

|-style="background:#fcc;"
| 63
| March 2
| @ Milwaukee
| 
| Tyler Herro (30)
| Bam Adebayo (12)
| Gabe Vincent (6)
| Fiserv Forum17,341
| 41–22
|-style="background:#cfc;"
| 64
| March 3
| @ Brooklyn
| 
| Bam Adebayo (30)
| Bam Adebayo (11)
| Tyler Herro (8)
| Barclays Center17,732
| 42–22
|-style="background:#cfc;"
| 65
| March 5
| Philadelphia
| 
| Butler, Herro (21)
| Bam Adebayo (10)
| Jimmy Butler (5)
| FTX Arena19,704
| 43–22
|-style="background:#cfc;"
| 66
| March 7
| Houston
| 
| Tyler Herro (31)
| P. J. Tucker (12)
| Kyle Lowry (5)
| FTX Arena19,600
| 44–22
|-style="background:#fcc;"
| 67
| March 9
| Phoenix
|  
| Duncan Robinson (22)
| Adebayo, Tucker (6)
| Kyle Lowry (10)
| FTX Arena19,600
| 44–23
|-style="background:#cfc;"
| 68
| March 11
| Cleveland
|   
| Bam Adebayo (30)
| Bam Adebayo (17)
| Kyle Lowry (10)
| FTX Arena19,600
| 45–23
|-style="background:#fcc;"
| 69
| March 12
| Minnesota
| 
| Tyler Herro (30)
| Bam Adebayo (12)
| Kyle Lowry (7)
| FTX Arena19,600
| 45–24
|-style="background:#cfc;"
| 70
| March 15
| Detroit
| 
| Tyler Herro (29)
| Bam Adebayo (8)
| Herro, Lowry (4)
| FTX Arena19,600
| 46–24 
|-style="background:#cfc;"
| 71
| March 18
| Oklahoma City
| 
| Tyler Herro (26)
| Bam Adebayo (9)
| Herro, Lowry, Vincent (4)
| FTX Arena19,600
| 47–24
|-style="background:#fcc;"
| 72
| March 21
| @ Philadelphia 
| 
| Jimmy Butler (27)
| Bam Adebayo (9)
| Butler, Lowry (6)
| Wells Fargo Center21,386
| 47–25
|-style="background:#fcc;"
| 73
| March 23
| Golden State
| 
| Kyle Lowry (26)
| Adebayo, Tucker (9) 
| Kyle Lowry (9)
| FTX Arena19,600
| 47–26
|-style="background:#fcc;"
| 74
| March 25
| New York
| 
| Jimmy Butler (30)
| Bam Adebayo (9)
| Jimmy Butler (7)
| FTX Arena19,600
| 47–27
|-style="background:#fcc;"
| 75
| March 26
| Brooklyn
| 
| Bam Adebayo (14)
| Dewayne Dedmon (9)
| Victor Oladipo (6)
| FTX Arena19,600
| 47–28
|-style="background:#cfc;"
| 76
| March 28
| Sacramento
| 
| Jimmy Butler (27)
| Bam Adebayo (15)
| Jimmy Butler (7)
| FTX Arena19,600
| 48–28
|-style="background:#cfc;"
| 77
| March 30
| @ Boston
| 
| Jimmy Butler (24)
| Bam Adebayo (12)
| Adebayo, Lowry (8)
| TD Garden19,156
| 49–28
|-

|-style="background:#cfc;"
| 78
| April 2
| @ Chicago
| 
| Jimmy Butler (22)
| Herro, Tucker (8)
| Kyle Lowry (10) 
| United Center21,697
| 50–28
|-style="background:#cfc;"
| 79
| April 3
| @ Toronto
| 
| Max Strus (23)
| Adebayo, Herro (9)
| Kyle Lowry (10)
| Scotiabank Arena19,800
| 51–28
|-style="background:#cfc;"
| 80
| April 5
| Charlotte
| 
| Tyler Herro (35)
| Bam Adebayo (9)
| Jimmy Butler (8)
| FTX Arena19,600
| 52–28
|-style="background:#cfc;"
| 81
| April 8
| Atlanta
| 
| Bam Adebayo (24)
| Bam Adebayo (6)
| Tyler Herro (9)
| FTX Arena19,993
| 53–28
|-style="background:#fcc;"
| 82
| April 10
| @ Orlando
| 
| Victor Oladipo (40)
| Oladipo, Yurtseven (10)
| Victor Oladipo (7)
| Amway Center19,253
| 53-29
|-

Playoffs

|-style="background:#cfc;"
| 1
| April 17
| Atlanta
| 
| Duncan Robinson (27)
| Adebayo, Butler (6)
| Kyle Lowry (9)
| FTX Arena19,514
| 1–0
|-style="background:#cfc;"
| 2
| April 19
| Atlanta
| 
| Jimmy Butler (45)
| Dewayne Dedmon (9)
| Jimmy Butler (5)
| FTX Arena19,950
| 2–0
|-style="background:#fcc;"
| 3
| April 22
| @ Atlanta
| 
| Tyler Herro (24)
| Bam Adebayo (11)
| Jimmy Butler (8)
| State Farm Arena18,421
| 2–1
|-style="background:#cfc;"
| 4
| April 24
| @ Atlanta
| 
| Jimmy Butler (36)
| Jimmy Butler (10)
| Butler, Oladipo, Vincent (4)
| State Farm Arena18,951
| 3–1
|-style="background:#cfc;"
| 5
| April 26
| Atlanta
| 
| Victor Oladipo (23)
| Bam Adebayo (11)
| Adebayo, Herro, Vincent (4)
| FTX Arena19,553
| 4–1

|-style="background:#cfc;"
| 1
| May 2
| Philadelphia
| 
| Tyler Herro (25)
| Bam Adebayo (12)
| Tyler Herro (7)
| FTX Arena19,620
| 1–0
|-style="background:#cfc;"
| 2
| May 4
| Philadelphia
| 
| Bam Adebayo (23)
| Bam Adebayo (9)
| Jimmy Butler (12)
| FTX Arena19,759
| 2–0
|-style="background:#fcc;"
| 3
| May 6
| @ Philadelphia
| 
| Jimmy Butler (33)
| Jimmy Butler (9)
| Kyle Lowry (3)
| Wells Fargo Center21,033
| 2–1
|-style="background:#fcc;"
| 4
| May 8
| @ Philadelphia
| 
| Jimmy Butler (40)
| Tyler Herro (10)
| Kyle Lowry (7)
| Wells Fargo Center21,194
| 2–2
|-style="background:#cfc;"
| 5
| May 10
| Philadelphia
| 
| Jimmy Butler (23)
| Max Strus (10)
| P.J. Tucker (7)
| FTX Arena19,868
| 3–2
|-style="background:#cfc;"
| 6
| May 12
| @ Philadelphia
| 
| Jimmy Butler (32)
| Max Strus (11)
| Gabe Vincent (6)
| Wells Fargo Center21,082
| 4–2

|-style="background:#cfc;"
| 1
| May 17
| Boston
| 
| Jimmy Butler (41)
| Jimmy Butler (9)
| Jimmy Butler (5)
| FTX Arena19,774
| 1–0
|-style="background:#fcc;"
| 2
| May 19
| Boston
| 
| Jimmy Butler (29)
| Bam Adebayo (9)
| Butler, Herro, Robinson, Vincent (3)
| FTX Arena20,100
| 1–1
|-style="background:#cfc;"
| 3
| May 21
| @ Boston
| 
| Bam Adebayo (31)
| Bam Adebayo (10)
| Adebayo, Lowry (6)
| TD Garden19,156
| 2–1
|-style="background:#fcc;"
| 4
| May 23
| @ Boston
| 
| Victor Oladipo (23)
| Jimmy Butler (7)
| Gabe Vincent (7)
| TD Garden19,156
| 2–2
|-style="background:#fcc;"
| 5
| May 25
| Boston
| 
| Bam Adebayo (18)
| P.J. Tucker (11)
| Jimmy Butler (4)
| FTX Arena19,819
| 2–3
|-style="background:#cfc;"
| 6
| May 27
| @ Boston
| 
| Jimmy Butler (47)
| Adebayo, Butler (9)
| Kyle Lowry (10)
| TD Garden19,156
| 3–3
|-style="background:#fcc;"
| 7
| May 29
| Boston
| 
| Jimmy Butler (35)
| Bam Adebayo (11)
| Bam Adebayo (4)
| FTX Arena20,200
| 3–4

Transactions

Trades

Free agency

Re-signed

Additions

Subtractions

References

Miami Heat seasons
Miami Heat
Miami Heat
Miami Heat